Bill Heard Enterprises was a company based in Columbus, Georgia. Founded in 1919, it operated a group of automobile dealerships, primarily in the Southern United States.
 At its peak, the company operated dealerships in Georgia, Alabama, Florida, Texas, Arizona and Nevada. By 2008, Bill Heard Enterprises was the 11th-largest automobile dealer in the United States (and as high as seventh at the start of the 21st century), the largest in the state of Georgia, and the largest dealer of Chevrolet automobiles.

It abruptly ceased operations on September 24, 2008, as a result of the ongoing troubles in the subprime lending markets and slower car sales. At the closure, there were 13 dealerships in the Heard chain, plus one that had closed two weeks prior. Four days after the closure of its dealerships, Bill Heard Enterprises filed for Chapter 11 bankruptcy protection.

History

1919-1957: Beginnings
Bill Heard Enterprises began in 1919 as the William T. Heard Motor Company, where Bill Heard Sr. sold LaSalle, Essex and Hudson cars from a showroom in downtown Columbus. Heard founded the company using an inheritance from an uncle. In 1932, he began his long association with Chevrolet when he bought out a competing dealership.

1958-2005: Expansion
Bill Heard Jr. joined the business in 1958 after attending Auburn University and a stint in the United States Navy. The younger Heard took over the company in 1961 when his father died. Heard Jr. undertook a massive expansion beyond its home state in the 1980s. The expansion, built primarily on the premise of selling large numbers of cars at low profit margins worked well in the boom times of the 1990s and the first decade of the new millennium. In advertisements, Heard dubbed himself "Mr. Big Volume" because of the stores' high sales volumes.

By 2005, the chain was at its peak, and Heard was a major figure in Columbus. A theater in the city's performing arts center was named for him, as was the street running past his flagship dealership. His advertisements were heard or seen frequently in media outlets in the cities where his company's dealerships operated. General Motors awarded BHE its highest honor, "Dealer of the Year."

2000s: Controversy over business practices
The company's expansion came at a price, however. Much of Heard's business was built on customers whose financial situation meant they would not qualify for loans from traditional lenders, such as banks, credit unions and GMAC (now Ally Financial). Heard's dealerships were accused of using deceptive practices to entice buyers to purchase cars, or to qualify their purchases by not being truthful about their financial qualifications or the automobiles they sought to buy. The chain was also accused of using a fake "urgent potential recall notice" from GM to encourage previous buyers to purchase a new car.

The company was in continuing trouble with the Governor of Georgia's Office of Consumer Affairs, with enforcement actions taking place 15 times. The state also filed a lawsuit over the recall-notice affair; that lawsuit was still being contested when the company closed. In 2006 and 2007, the state reported (after an inquiry by the son of Heard Jr.) that BHE had 113 complaints filed against it by Georgia consumers, while the five largest competitors had a combined total of ten.

2007-2008: Market troubles
In 2007, the Heard chain represented $2.1 billion revenue, much of which came from the sale of new GM products. That year, however, its dealerships began to post significant monthly losses as the domestic auto market faced a downturn. In 2008, dealerships posted monthly losses that ranged from $2 to $5 million.
 
The company started to encounter problems when the market for subprime lending diminished drastically, as a result of similar issues with lenders of subprime mortgages. This cut off both a source of much of its customer base, but additional income from fees paid to Heard by subprime lenders, often 2% to 3% of the sale price. On August 21, 2008, there was also an issue with GM's lending arm GMAC, where Bill Heard lost GM's line of GMAC credit with some stores concerning the financing of new inventory. About that same time, the state of Georgia announced its plans for legal action against BHE regarding the fake recall notice promotion. In August 2008, the company had seen a 26 percent drop of year-to-date sales since the year before.

By September 2008, Bill Heard Enterprises was the 11th-largest automobile dealer in the United States (and as high as seventh at the start of the 21st century), the largest in the state of Georgia, and the largest dealer of Chevrolet automobiles in the United States. Automotive News also ranked it 13th among auto dealership groups in the United States.

2008: Dealerships closures
With mounting pressure from lenders and regulators, the company first closed its Scottsdale, Arizona location on September 12. Twelve days later, BHE announced the closure of the remainder of the company operations,  and the company abruptly ceased operations on September 24, 2008, closing its 14 Chevy dealerships and putting about 3,200 people out of work. Heard claimed the closures affected around 2,700 employees. It had five dealerships in Georgia, and six in other states including Alabama, Arizona, Florida, Nevada, Tennessee and Texas. Bill Heard Chevrolet in Sugar Land did stay in business, as of September 25, 2008. Warranties at closed dealerships remained valid at other Chevrolet dealerships.

The company attributed the closures to the rising price of fuel and an inventory overly focused on heavy trucks and SUVS during an economic slowdown.  The Wall Street Journal described the shutdown "after 89 years in business" as "monumental because of [Heard]'s strategic importance to GM."

2008-2009: Bankruptcy and dealerships sales
On September 28, the company filed for bankruptcy protection in Decatur, Alabama. Debtors included BMW, J.P. Morgan Chase and GMAC (now Ally Financial), for debts of around $229 million. The company listed both debt and assets of $500 million to $1 billion.
 
Following the filing, Judge Jack Caddell of the United States District Court for the Northern District of Alabama set terms for Heard to find one or more buyers, to be approved by the court and General Motors. At the time it filed for bankruptcy, the company had already been in talks with various prospective buyers for individual dealerships.  NASCAR team owner and automobile dealer Rick Hendrick was mentioned as a possible buyer, as well as a dealer from San Diego, California. Heard's dealership in Scottsdale, Arizona remained open while a new owner was sought, while by September 30, the Sugar Land, Texas dealership had already been taken over by a new owner.

The flagship store in Columbus Georgia in 2009 was operating under new ownership, as Legacy Automotive.

Private investment company Oak Point Partners acquired the remnant assets, consisting of any known and unknown assets that weren't previously administered, from the Bill Heard Enterprises, Inc., et al., Bankruptcy Estates on November 15, 2013.

See also
List of Georgia (U.S. state) companies

References

External links
Archive.org snapshot of billheard.com as of July 10, 2007

Retail companies established in 1919
Retail companies disestablished in 2008
Companies based in Columbus, Georgia
Companies that filed for Chapter 11 bankruptcy in 2008
Defunct companies based in Georgia (U.S. state)
Auto dealerships of the United States
1919 establishments in Georgia (U.S. state)
2008 disestablishments in Georgia (U.S. state)
Former auto dealerships